Ireneusz Jacek Raś (born 30 September 1972 in Proszowice) is a Polish politician. He was elected to the Sejm on 25 September 2005, getting 6,690 votes in 13 Kraków district as a candidate from the Civic Platform list. In the 2019 Polish parliamentary election, he was elected to Sejm as a member of Civic Platform. He was expelled from the party in 2021. In June 2021 he joined Polish Coalition as an Independent. On 13 October 2022, Rás launched the Centre for Poland as a political party, which will be a member of the Polish Coalition.

See also
Members of Polish Sejm 2005-2007

References

External links
Ireneusz Raś - parliamentary page - includes declarations of interest, voting record, and transcripts of speeches.

Civic Platform politicians
1972 births
Living people
Members of the Polish Sejm 2005–2007
Members of the Polish Sejm 2007–2011
Members of the Polish Sejm 2011–2015
Members of the Polish Sejm 2015–2019
Members of the Polish Sejm 2019–2023